Alexander Reginald Willette (born April 2, 1989) is an American politician from Maine. In 2010, the Republican Willette was elected to represent District 7 in the Maine House of Representatives, covering much of central Aroostook County including part of the city of Presque Isle. He served as the Assistant Republican Leader, and, during his time in the Legislature, was both the youngest member of legislative leadership in Maine's history and the youngest in the United States.

Early life and education
He was born in Presque Isle, Maine and lives Mapleton, Maine. A graduate of Presque Isle High School, Willette earned a B.A. in political science from the University of Maine at Farmington in May 2011. He has a Juris Doctor degree from the University of Maine School of Law.

Career

Maine House of Representatives

Elections
In 2010, he decided to run for Maine's 7th House district based in Aroostook County. He was the Republican nominee and defeated Democrat nominee Troy Haines 54%-46%. He became the youngest person to ever win an election for the Maine House of Representatives. In 2012, he won re-election to a second term, defeating Haines again, 52%-48%.

Tenure
The district includes 10 towns: Castle Hill, Chapman, Hammond, Littleton, Mapleton, Masardis, Monticello, Wade, Washburn, and Oxbow. In addition, it also includes part of the city of Presque isle and unorganized territory of Central Aroostook.

He was also the House Chairman of the Legislative Youth Advisory Council for the 125th Legislature. In the next session, he was elected as Assistant Minority Leader of the House GOP leadership.

In his first term in the Maine House, he sponsored a resolution which passed raising the speed limit on I-95 between Houlton, Maine and Old Town, Maine.

He resigned his seat on September 4, 2014, stating that his work on Governor Paul LePage's reelection campaign has rendered him unable to adequately represent his district.

Committee assignments
Leaves of Absence
Rules and Business
Transportation
Veterans and Legal Affairs

2014 congressional election

On July 1, 2013, Willette announced he would run for the open Maine's 2nd congressional district seat, after incumbent congressman Mike Michaud announced he would run for governor, though he suspended his campaign on August 28, 2013.

State of Maine
In 2014 he served as Director of Communications and Coalitions for Paul LePage's Campaign for Governor.

From 2014 to 2015 he served as Director of Legislative Affairs and Communications for the Maine Department of Administrative and Financial Services.

From 2015 to 2019 he served as an Assistant District Attorney in the State of Maine.

Other activities
From 2008 to 2018 he was an Associate Broker for Big Bear Real Estate. After leaving the Trump administration he returned to that position.

From 2013 to 2019 he served as a member of the Republican National Committee representing the State of Maine.

Military service
He joined the Maine Army National Guard in May 2017.

Currently as a captain, he served as a State Trial Defense Counsel. Previously he had served As the Assistant Brigade Judge Advocate for the 120th Regional Support Group in Bangor, Maine.

Trump administration
He joined the Trump administration in 2019.

From April 2019 to January 2021 he has served as a Special Assistant To The President and Deputy Director of Political Affairs for Outreach in the Executive Office of the President.

Personal life
Willette is married to Melissa Willette and they live in Mapleton. He is a Master Mason with the Trinity lodge. He is an Eagle Scout with Troop 170 in Mapleton and 171 in Presque Isle.

His father, Michael Willette, served in the Maine House of Representatives from 2008 to 2012, representing District 5 in Presque Isle.

References

1989 births
Living people
People from Presque Isle, Maine
Republican Party members of the Maine House of Representatives
University of Maine at Farmington alumni
University of Maine School of Law alumni
Republican National Committee members
Trump administration personnel
United States Army officers